Eglė Bogdanienė  (born August 1, 1962, in Vilnius) is a Lithuanian textile artist.

In 1985 he graduated from the Lithuanian Institute of Fine Arts and in 1991 until 2002 he worked in the Vilnius Academy of Fine Arts, in the Textile Department.

He is the creator of textile compositions and tapestries, carefully weaving in subtle colors. From 1986 he participated in art exhibitions in Lithuania and foreign countries.

References

Lithuanian painters
1962 births
Living people
Artists from Vilnius
Vilnius Academy of Arts alumni
Academic staff of the Vilnius Academy of Arts